Standing in the Way of Control is the third studio album by American indie rock band Gossip, which was released on January 24, 2006. The album was produced by Guy Picciotto and Ryan Hadlock It reached number 1 on the UK indie chart and also reached Gold status in the United Kingdom.

Irish Times  described Beth Ditto's performance on the album as "a compelling combination of Brenda Lee, Dolly Parton and Siouxsie Sioux." Describing the title track, journalist Kevin Courtney noted that it was a "barnstorming indie-electro-disco stomper".

The title track also serves as the unofficial theme song to the British teen drama Skins, as its use in the DVD menu and promotional material led viewers to associate it with the series. It is also featured on the show's soundtrack album.

Track listing
All songs written by Gossip.

"Fire with Fire" – 2:49
"Standing in the Way of Control" – 4:16
"Jealous Girls" – 3:39
"Coal to Diamonds" – 4:00
"Eyes Open" – 2:10
"Yr Mangled Heart" – 4:22
"Listen Up!" – 4:18
"Holy Water" – 2:43
"Keeping You Alive" – 3:47
"Dark Lines" – 3:27

Some versions of the album have an eleventh bonus track, the Le Tigre remix of the track "Standing in the Way of Control".
The Australia & New Zealand version of the album has two bonus tracks:

  "Here Today Gone Tomorrow"
 "Sick with It"

In 2007, the album was re-released with two bonus tracks:
  "Listen Up!" (2007 version) – sped-up version (like title track)
 "Standing in the Way of Control" (Soulwax Nite version) – a dance remix

Personnel
 Beth Ditto – vocalist
 Brace Paine – guitar, bass guitar, piano on "Dark Lines"
 Hannah Blilie – drums, backing vocals on "Jealous Girls" and "Yr Mangled Heart"
 Ryan Hadlock and Guy Picciotto at Bear Creek Recording Studio in Seattle Washington – production, recording, mixing

Charts

Weekly charts

Year-end charts

Certifications and sales

References

2006 albums
Gossip (band) albums
Kill Rock Stars albums
Albums produced by Guy Picciotto
Albums recorded at Bear Creek Studio